David Almazán Abril (born 12 February 1974), known as David Pirri or simply Pirri, is a Spanish retired footballer who played as a midfielder, and a manager who currently manages Bayamón FC in the Liga Puerto Rico.

He amassed Segunda División totals of 202 matches and 11 goals over nine seasons, representing mainly Barcelona B. He added 97 scoreless appearances in La Liga, with Mérida, Numancia and Zaragoza.

In 2008, Pirri started working as a manager.

Playing career
Born in Sabadell, Barcelona, Catalonia, Pirri joined FC Barcelona's youth setup in 1988, aged 14. After a brief stint at the C-team he was promoted to the reserves in Segunda División, and made his professional debut with the latter on 6 February 1993, coming on as a second half substitute in a 6–1 home routing of Palamós CF.

Pirri scored his first league goal on 16 October 1994, netting the first in a 2–1 away win against CD Leganés. In the 1995 summer he signed for La Liga club CP Mérida, and made his debut in the competition on 24 September 1995 by playing the full 90 minutes in a 0–1 loss at SD Compostela.

In August 1999, after alternating between the first two major levels, Pirri joined Deportivo de La Coruña, being immediately loaned to UD Las Palmas. He appeared sparingly due to a serious knee injury, as his team returned to the top level after a 12-year absence.

In the 2000 off-season, Pirri moved on loan to CD Numancia in the top flight, appearing regularly but being relegated. In the following year, still owned by Deportivo, he signed with Sporting de Gijón.

In July 2002, Pirri agreed to a two-year contract with second division side Real Zaragoza. He left in 2005 after appearing in only two matches during the campaign, and joined Albacete Balompié.

In August 2006, after a failed trial at Gimnàstic de Tarragona, Pirri moved to Mérida UD from Segunda División B. He signed with fellow league team CE Sabadell FC the following year, and retired with the club in 2008 aged 33.

Coaching career
After his retirement, Pirri was appointed manager of his last club Sabadell's youth setup. On 27 November 2009, after Ramón Moya's dismissal at the helm of the first team, he was named his successor.

In May 2014, Pirri was named coach of Terrassa FC.

Honours
Mérida
Segunda División: 1996–97

Las Palmas
Segunda División: 1999–2000

Zaragoza
Copa del Rey: 2003–04

References

External links
 
 
 

1974 births
Living people
Sportspeople from Sabadell
Spanish footballers
Footballers from Catalonia
Association football midfielders
La Liga players
Segunda División players
Segunda División B players
Tercera División players
FC Barcelona C players
FC Barcelona Atlètic players
CP Mérida footballers
Deportivo de La Coruña players
UD Las Palmas players
CD Numancia players
Sporting de Gijón players
Real Zaragoza players
Albacete Balompié players
Mérida UD footballers
CE Sabadell FC footballers
Spanish football managers
Segunda División B managers
CE Sabadell FC managers
Terrassa FC managers
Shanghai Shenhua F.C. non-playing staff